Zhitkovo is a settlement on Karelian Isthmus, in Vyborgsky District of Leningrad Oblast. It was a station of the Vyborg–Veshchevo–Zhitkovo–Michurinskoye railroad constructed by Finland in the 1920s. However, the Zhitkovo-Michurinskoye link has been dismantled in the 1950s, and the Veshchevo-Zhitkovo link—in 2001.

Rural localities in Leningrad Oblast
Karelian Isthmus